The Irish Film and Television Network is a company that provides news and a directory service of information related to the Irish film industry.

External links
 Official web site

Mass media in the Republic of Ireland
Film organisations in Ireland